Italy first participated at the fourth World Championships held in 1909, while it was a mens-only competition.  Italian women first competed in 1950.

Medalists

Medal tables

By gender

By event

Junior World medalists

See also 
 Italy women's national artistic gymnastics team
 List of Olympic female artistic gymnasts for Italy

References

World Artistic Gymnastics Championships
Gymnastics in Italy